Ray Jewers (15 October 1945 – 3 October 1993) was a Canadian actor.

Filmography

Film
 Twilight's Last Gleaming (1977) as Sgt. Domino
 A Bridge Too Far (1977) as U.S. radio operator
 The Spy Who Loved Me (1977) as USS Wayne Crewman
 Valentino (1977) as Electrician
 Jaguar Lives! (1979) as Jessup
 Scum (1979) as Gym Instructor
 Edge of Sanity (1989) as Inspector Newcomen
 The Phantom of the Opera (1989) as Elise

Television films
 Gulag (1985) as T.V. Interviewer
 The Return of Sherlock Holmes (1987) as Singer
 J.F.K.: Reckless Youth (1993) as Patriotic Man
 Dieppe (1993) as Army Captain
 TekWar (1994) as Bennett Sands
 TekWar: TekLords (1994) as Bennett Sands
 Wild Justice (1994) as Admiral (final film role)

Television appearances
 Road to Avonlea (1994) as Mr. Ambrose  – episode Modern Times
 Dempsey and Makepeace (1985) as Phil Parris  – episode Armed and Extremely Dangerous

External links
 

1945 births
1993 deaths
Canadian male film actors
Canadian male television actors
20th-century Canadian male actors